Jean Dupuy (25 May 1934, Vic-en-Bigorre-27 October 2010, same town) was a French rugby union footballer.  He was a left-wing for Stadoceste Tarbais, where he debuted aged 19, and the French national side, gaining 40 caps and scoring 19 tries.  He was 1.75 m high and weighed 84 kg.

He consecutively won 4 Five Nations Championships (along with Michel Crauste, Alfred Roques, Jacques Bouquet and Henri Rancoule), in 1959, 1960 (along with England), 1961 and 1962.

External links
Statistics on espnscrum.com

French rugby union players
1934 births
2010 deaths
Sportspeople from Hautes-Pyrénées
Rugby union wings